Avari may refer to:
Avari (Middle-earth), a group of elves in J. R. R. Tolkien's fantasy writings  
Avars (Pannonia), a group of people in pre-medieval Europe.
Avari Hotels, a Pakistani chain of Hotels affiliated with the Avari Group.
Erick Avari (born 1952), Indian-American television, film and theater actor.

See also
Avar (disambiguation)